Steve Webster is a Canadian bassist, record producer, arranger, audio engineer and composer. A multiple Juno Award nominee and winner, Webster's career spans over 3 decades of music production and performance. Recent accomplishments include Juno Award nominations for Producer of the Year and Jazz Vocal Album of the Year for Emilie-Claire Barlow's album Clear Day.

A founding member of Canada's The Parachute Club, Webster was part of Toronto's vibrant music scene in the '80s and '90s, working often at Hamilton's Grant Avenue Studio, home to Daniel Lanois
 and David Bottrill. Webster has worked with other notable producers Michael Beinhorn and 
Rick Parashar.
 
Webster recorded and performed live with Canadian stars Alannah Myles, Dalbello and Carole Pope. He also played bass on Billy Idol's Rebel Yell album and subsequent 1984 tour.

In 1986 Webster joined Toronto jingle company The Air Company beginning a 20 year career composing music for television commercials. He would later become a composer and partner in Canada's top jingle company RMW Music.

Webster was invited to perform the song "Rise Up" with Lorraine Segato at Jack Layton's state funeral in 2011. Webster co-wrote and recorded the song on the eponymously titled The Parachute Club album sharing a Juno Award for Single of the Year.

Recording & Touring

References 

1958 births
Living people
Musicians from Toronto
20th-century Canadian bass guitarists
21st-century Canadian bass guitarists